José Adeón Santos León (born April 26, 1961, in Concepción, Chile) is a retired Chilean thoroughbred jockey who has been honored by the National Museum of Racing and Hall of Fame in the United States.

Career
Jose Santos first raced horses at the Club Hípico de Concepción in his native Chile, following in the footsteps of his father and three of his seven brothers, and in Colombia before moving to the United States in 1984. There he was the top money-winning jockey four years in a row, from 1986 through 1989, winning the 1988 Eclipse Award for Outstanding Jockey in the United States; Santos was at the top of the sport during those years. He won seven Breeders' Cup races and won the 1999 Belmont Stakes aboard Lemon Drop Kid.  He won the 2003 Kentucky Derby and Preakness Stakes with Funny Cide but missed winning the Triple Crown of Thoroughbred Racing after finishing third in the Belmont Stakes.  More recently, Santos has said that Funny Cide was not the greatest horse he ever rode but certainly was his personal favorite.

In 1999, Santos won the coveted George Woolf Memorial Jockey Award (since 1950, presented annually to the thoroughbred horseracing jockey in North America who demonstrates high standards of personal and professional conduct both on and off the racetrack); the Award has long been considered a very high honor, for the winning jockey is selected by his peers. Santos also won the 2003 ESPY Awards as the foremost jockey in the United States.  He has long been a favorite of aficionados of the sport and is one of the best-liked and most respected jockeys in it.

Santos and his first wife, Maria, who was from Roslyn Heights, were divorced in 1994; they had two children during the marriage.  Daughter Sophia Santos was graduated from Roslyn High School in 2005, then briefly attended the Fashion Institute of Technology.  Son Jose Ricardo Santos was a graduated from the same high school in 2007 and now serves in the United States Marine Corps.

In 2011 Jose Santos' biography, Above It All: The Turbulent Life of Jose Santos, was authored by award-winning author Bill Heller.

Libel lawsuit

In 2004, José Santos and Sackatoga Stable, owners of thoroughbred Funny Cide, filed a $48 million libel suit against The Miami Herald because of a story by freelance writer Frank Carlson and a photograph that appeared in its issue for May 10, 2003, seven days after Santos won the Kentucky Derby.

The photograph, with accompanying comments, was posted highlighting what appeared to be a metallic object in Santos's right hand as he and Funny Cide crossed the finish line.  Due to the angle from which the photograph was taken, it appeared that Santos was holding an object in his right hand, and so raised suspicion that he had cheated to win the world-famous race.  Subsequent developments furthered the suspicion. When asked about what the photo appeared to show, Santos thought the reporter was asking about an object around his wrist and was quoted as identifying the object as a "cue ring", triggering an investigation.

The Chilean-born jockey, whose only English is heavily accented, tried later to explain that he had called the object around his wrist a "Q ray," which is a magnetic bracelet worn by athletes to ease joint pain.

Santos hired attorney David Travis to defend him before the Kentucky Racing Commission. Experts were called in to examine the initial photograph and numerous others (showing the same scene but shot from different angles).  At the conclusion of the investigation, Santos was cleared of all charges. The results of the investigation showed that in reality Santos did not have an object in his hand and it was the angle of the photograph that only made it appear otherwise.  Other photographs and angles showed absolutely nothing in Santos's hand and revealed that it would have been virtually impossible for him to be holding anything.

The $48 million libel suit against The Miami Herald was settled in 2008. Santos's Palm Beach attorney, litigator Bruce S. Rogow, told reporters his client was "pleased" with the confidential terms.

Advertising controversy
José Santos was also one of the first of five top jockeys (the others were Jerry Bailey, John Velazquez, Gary Stevens, and Shane Sellers) to wear advertising patches in the Kentucky Derby, starting in 2004.  They sued, with an argument grounded in the First Amendment to the United States Constitution, to be allowed to wear such patches during the race.  The ruling was issued on April 21, 2004, by U.S. District Judge John Heyburn in Louisville.

The jockeys in question had been offered substantial endorsement contracts to wear the ad patches, with payments, in some cases, of $30,000 apiece.  Wearing this advertising was legal in the other Triple Crown states, New York and Maryland, but the Kentucky Horse Racing Authority had maintained that such advertising violated racing tradition and might lead to corruption.

Retirement
On February 1, 2007, Santos, then 45 years old, was involved in a three-horse racing accident at Aqueduct Racetrack in New York. He suffered five broken vertebrae, a broken sternum, and several broken ribs.

Santos initially planned to return to riding by late 2007.  However, he did not fully recover from his spinal injuries. Advised by his doctors that it would be far too dangerous for him to return to riding and that he would likely end up paralyzed should he have another accident, Santos, along with his current wife, Rita, and the support of his children, decided to retire.

One week before his induction into the National Museum of Racing and Hall of Fame, Santos announced his retirement in several press conferences at the Saratoga Race Course. The first was held in the press box at the racecourse.  With his usual smile, though later showing other emotion, Santos informed the press that he would retire.  He received a standing ovation from all in attendance, with most members of the press waiting to personally shake his hand and wish him well. Another press conference was held in the jockey's room and was televised on the Saratoga Race Course television station. With all of his fellow jockeys in attendance, it was an emotional scene not only Santos but for many other jockeys. Here as well, Santos received a touching standing ovation from his peers and friends of many years. Almost every jockey in attendance, many from all over the United States, waited until the end to greet Santos, some with a handshake and even more with an embracing hug.

A much moved José Santos said:

One week later, when Santos was formally inducted into the Hall of Fame, he received an unprecedented three standing ovations from the crowd. It was one of the best attended Hall of Fame ceremonies in years.  Family and friends accompanied Santos to the induction ceremonies at Saratoga, including his second wife, Rita, from whom he is currently separated, and his two eldest children, José Ricardo and Sophia, from his first marriage to Maria.

Lifetime statistics: 25,928 mounts, 4,083 wins, and earnings of $188,561,787, ranking him eleventh in the all-time jockey rankings.

Year-end charts

Triple Crown Race Record 

Kentucky Derby: 8-1-0-0

Preakness: 4-1-0-0

Belmont: 14-1-2-1

References
The official Biography of Jockey Jose Santos
Jose Santos at the NTRA
USA Today Derby Jockeys Can Wear Ads
Sports Illustrated article Jose Santos Retires From Racing
ESPN Funny Cide Jockey Jose Santos Retires From Racing

1961 births
Living people
American jockeys
Chilean emigrants to the United States
Chilean jockeys
Eclipse Award winners
American Champion jockeys
United States Thoroughbred Racing Hall of Fame inductees
Sportspeople from Concepción, Chile
Chilean male equestrians